The men's 4 x 400 metres relay at the 1946 European Athletics Championships was held in Oslo, Norway, at Bislett Stadion on 25 August 1946.

Medalists

Results

Final
25 August

Participation
According to an unofficial count, 24 athletes from 6 countries participated in the event.

 (4)
 (4)
 (4)
 (4)
 (4)
 (4)

References

4 x 400 metres relay
4 x 400 metres relay at the European Athletics Championships